The Philadelphia Distanced Run is an annual half marathon road running event which takes place in Philadelphia, Pennsylvania in the United States on the third Sunday of September.

The competition was established in 1978 as the Philadelphia Distance Run and was founded by Gene H. Martenson, and was held under this name until 2009. Starting in 2010 when Competitor Group Inc. bought the rights to the race, it has been part of the Rock 'n' Roll Marathon Series of running competitions. It is now a hybrid profit/non-profit model race.

The race quickly became a top level race with international competition: four-time Olympic champion Lasse Virén of Finland won at the second edition and he was followed by further foreign Olympic medalists in New Zealand's Rod Dixon and Michael Musyoki of Kenya. Joan Samuelson took consecutive victories in the women's race in 1983 to 1985, which included world record times of 1:09:14 hours and 1:08:34 hours in 1983 and 1984. The latter mark stood as the American record for over twenty years and was broken by Deena Kastor at the 2005 edition of the Philadelphia Distance Run, with her winning time of 1:07:53 hours. The men's race has also seen historically fast times: Michael Musyoki's winning time of 1:01:36 hours in 1982 was a world record and in 1985 Mark Curp ran a world record time of 1:00:55 hours. On top of this, Dionicio Cerón's winning time of 1:00:46 hours in 1990 was recognised by the Association of Road Racing Statisticians as their world best mark, as per their stricter criteria.

The current course records were set in 2011 and both are the fastest times ever recorded for the half marathon on American soil: Mathew Kisorio ran the fourth fastest time ever (58:46 minutes) while Kim Smith's women's record of 1:07:11 hours made her the seventh fastest female ever in the half marathon.

The 2020 and 2021 editions of the race were cancelled due to the coronavirus pandemic.

In February of 2021, a local group of race organizers announced the return of the Philadelphia Distance Run starting in September, 2021.

Winners 

Key:

Notes

References

List of winners
Philadelphia Half Marathon. Association of Road Racing Statisticians (2011-09-21). Retrieved on 2011-10-05.

External links
Official website
Historical race results (archived)

Half marathons in the United States
Sports competitions in Philadelphia
Sports in Philadelphia
Recurring sporting events established in 1978
1978 establishments in Pennsylvania